The Islamic Revolutionary Guard Corps (IRGC;), also called Sepah or Pasdaran, is a multi-service primary branch of the Iranian Armed Forces. It was officially established by Ruhollah Khomeini as a military branch in May 1979, in the aftermath of the Islamic Revolution. Whereas the Iranian Army protects the country's sovereignty in a traditional capacity, the IRGC's constitutional mandate is to ensure the integrity of the Islamic Republic. Most interpretations of this mandate assert that it entrusts the IRGC with preventing foreign interference in Iran, thwarting coups by the traditional military, and crushing "deviant movements" that harm the ideological legacy of the Islamic Revolution. Currently, the IRGC is designated as a terrorist organization by Bahrain, Saudi Arabia, and the United States.

, the IRGC had at least 250,000 total personnel. The IRGC Navy is now Iran's primary force exercising operational control over the Persian Gulf. The IRGC's Basij, a paramilitary volunteer militia, has about 90,000 active personnel. It operates a media arm, known as "Sepah News" within Iran. On 16 March 2022, it adopted a new independent branch called the "Command for the Protection and Security of Nuclear Centres" involved with Iran's nuclear programme.

Originating as an ideological militia, the IRGC has taken a greater role in nearly every aspect of Iranian politics and society. Reuters opined in 2019 that "It is also an industrial empire with political clout"; the branch's expanded social, political, military, and economic role under Mahmoud Ahmadinejad—especially during the 2009 presidential election and the suppression of post-election protests—has led many Western analysts to argue that it has surpassed even the country's Shia Islamic clerical system in terms of political power.

Since 2019, Hossein Salami has served as the IRGC's incumbent commander-in-chief.

Terminology
Government organizations in Iran are commonly known by one-word names (that generally denote their function) rather than acronyms or shortened versions, and the general populace universally refers to the IRGC as Sepâh. Sepâh has a historical connotation of soldiers, while in modern Persian it is also used to describe a corps-sized unit – in modern Persian Artesh is the more standard term for an army.

Pâsdârân is the plural form of Pâsdâr, meaning "Guardian", and members of Sepah are known as Pāsdār, which is also their title and comes after their rank.

Apart from the name Islamic Revolutionary Guard Corps, the Iranian Government, media, and those who identify with the organization generally use Sepāh-e Pâsdârân (Army of the Guardians), although it is not uncommon to hear Pâsdârân-e Enghelâb (Guardians of the Revolution), or simply Pâsdârân (Guardians) as well. Among the Iranian population, and especially among diaspora Iranians, using the word Pasdaran indicates hatred or admiration for the organization.

Most foreign governments and the English-speaking mass media tend to use the term Iranian Revolutionary Guards (IRG) or simply the Revolutionary Guards. In the US media, the force is frequently referred to interchangeably as the Iranian Revolutionary Guard Corps or the Islamic Revolutionary Guard Corps (IRGC). The US government standard is Islamic Revolutionary Guard Corps, while the United Nations uses Iranian Revolutionary Guard Corps.

Organization

The force's main role is in national security. It is responsible for internal and border security, law enforcement, and also Iran's missile forces. IRGC operations are geared towards asymmetric warfare and less traditional duties. These include the control of smuggling, control of the Strait of Hormuz, and resistance operations. The IRGC is intended to complement the more traditional role of the regular Iranian military, with the two forces operating separately and focusing on different operational roles.

The IRGC is a combined arms force with its own ground forces, navy, air force, intelligence, and special forces. It also controls the Basij militia. The Basij is a volunteer-based force, with 90,000 regular soldiers and 300,000 reservists. The IRGC is officially recognized as a component of the Iranian military under Article 150 of the Iranian Constitution. It is separate from, and parallel to, the other arm of Iran's military, which is called Artesh (another Persian word for an army). Especially in the waters of the Persian Gulf, the IRGC is expected to assume control of any Iranian response to attacks on its nuclear facilities.

History and structure
The IRGC was formed on 5 May 1979 following the Islamic Revolution of 1979 in an effort to consolidate several paramilitary forces into a single force loyal to the new government and to function as a counter to the influence and power of the regular military, initially seen as a potential source of opposition because of its traditional loyalty to the Shah. From the beginning of the new Islamic government, the Pasdaran (Pasdaran-e Enghelab-e Islami) functioned as a corps of the faithful. The Constitution of the Islamic Republic entrusted the defense of Iran's territorial integrity and political independence to the regular military (artesh), while it gave the Pasdaran the responsibility of preserving the Revolution itself.

Days after Ayatollah Ruhollah Khomeini's return to Tehran on 1 February 1979, Mehdi Bazargan's interim administration established the Pasdaran under a decree issued by Khomeini on 5 May. The Pasdaran was intended to protect the Revolution and to assist the ruling clerics in the day-to-day enforcement of the new government's Islamic codes and morality. There were other, perhaps more important, reasons for establishing the Pasdaran. The Revolution needed to rely on a force of its own rather than borrowing the previous regime's tainted units. As one of the first revolutionary institutions, the Pasdaran helped legitimize the Revolution and gave the new government an armed basis of support. Moreover, the establishment of the Pasdaran served notice to both the population and the regular armed forces that the Khomeini government was quickly developing its own enforcement body.

Thus, the Pasdaran, along with its political counterpart, Crusade for Reconstruction, brought a new order to Iran. In time, the Pasdaran would rival the police and the judiciary in terms of its functions. 

Although the IRGC operated independently of the regular armed forces, it was often considered to be a military force in its own right due to its important role in Iranian defense. The IRGC consists of ground, naval, and aviation troops, which parallel the structure of the regular military. The Pasdaran was "given control of Iran’s ballistic missile program in both missile employment and development.

Also contained under the umbrella of the more conventional Pasdaran, were the Basij Forces (Mobilization Resistance Force), a network of potentially up to a million active individuals who could be called upon in times of need. The Basij could be committed to assist in the defense of the country against internal or external threats, but by 2008 had also been deployed in mobilizing voters in elections and alleged tampering during such activities. Another element was the Quds Force, a special forces element tasked with unconventional warfare roles and known to be involved in providing assistance and training to various militant organizations around the world.

The Pasdaran is closely associated with Supreme Leader Khomeini who came to power in 1989, and used the Pasdaran to build support. Reportedly he reached "far down into the ranks and appointed new colonels and brigadiers. 'Khamenei micromanages the whole system, so everyone is loyal to him, He is hyperactive. He knows every low-ranking commander and even the names of their children'", according to Mehdi Khalaji of the Washington Institute for Near East Policy.

The Basij and Pasdaran were instrumental in crushing the Green Movement, and this power gave them political supremecy in Iran. According to at least one source (Abbas Milani, the director of the Iranian Studies program at Stanford), the regime “clearly ... believed it was going to lose control, and the IRGC and the Basij saved the day. The result is that the IRGC now has the upper hand. Khamenei knows that without the IRGC he’d be out of a job in twenty-four hours.”

Yahya Rahim Safavi, head of the IRGC since 1997, was dismissed as commander in chief of the Revolutionary Guards in August 2007. The dismissal of Safavi disrupted the balance of power in Iran to the advantage of conservatives. Analysis in the international press considered the removal of Safavi to be a sign of change in the defense strategies of Iran, but the general policies of the Iranian Revolutionary Guard Corps are not personally determined by its commander.

Iran's top nuclear scientist, Mohsen Fakhrizadeh, was assassinated in Tehran, Iran on 27 November 2020. Fakhrizadeh was believed to be the primary force behind Iran's covert nuclear program for many decades. The New York Times reported that Israel's Mossad was behind that attack and that Mick Mulroy, the former Deputy Defense Secretary for the Middle East said the death of Fakhirizadeh was "a setback to Iran's nuclear program" and he was also a senior officer in the Islamic Revolutionary Guard Corps, and that "will magnify Iran’s desire to respond by force."

Military structure

In late July 2008 reports originating that the IRGC was in the process of dramatically changing its structure. In a shake-up, in September 2008 Iran's Revolutionary Guards established 31 divisions and an autonomous missile command. The new structure changes the IRGC from a centralized to a decentralized force with 31 provincial corps, whose commanders wield extensive authority and power. According to the plan, each of Iran's thirty provinces will have a provincial corps, except Tehran Province, which will have two.

Joint Staff
Islamic Revolutionary Guard Corps Joint Staff

Basij

The Basij is a paramilitary volunteer militia or "plainclothes militia" founded by the order of the Ayatollah Khomeini in November 1979. On November 4, 1979, in an address to the Revolutionary Guards during the Iran hostage crisis, Khomeini ordered the creation of an army of "twenty million Iranians" (Artesh-e bis million), proclaiming:
"Equip yourself, get military training and train your friends. Give military training to those who are not trained. In an Islamic country, everyone should be a soldier and have military training. ... a country with 20 million young people [should have] 20 million riflemen, an army of 20 million" This pronouncement and Article 151 of the constitution, which calls for the government to “provide a program of military training, with all requisite facilities, for all its citizens, in accordance with the Islamic criteria, in such a way that all citizens will always be able to engage in the armed defense of the Islamic Republic of Iran,” are believed to refer to the Basij. While "Iranian official estimates sometime put their total part-time and full-time strength at more than 20 million", others estimate the Basij as having "a core strength of 90,000, and up to 600,000" (CSIS, 11 January 2018, p. 4); at 100,000 with "hundreds of thousands of additional Basij could be mobilized in the event or an all-out war" (CRS, 23 May 2018, p. 18).

The Basij are "the most visible symbol" of the Pasdaran's strength, whose members "can be seen on street corners in every Iranian city". They are (at least in theory) subordinate to, and receive their orders from, the Iranian Revolutionary Guards and current Supreme Leader Ayatollah Khamenei. However they have also been described as "a loosely allied group of organizations" including "many groups controlled by local clerics." Currently, the Basij serve as an auxiliary force engaged in activities such as internal security as well as law enforcement auxiliary, the providing of social service, organizing of public religious ceremonies, and as morality police and the suppression of dissident gatherings.

Quds Force

The elite Quds Force (or Jerusalem Force), sometimes described as the successor to the Shah's Imperial Guards, is estimated to be 2,000–5,000 in number. It is a special operations unit, handling activities abroad. The force basically does not engage directly.

Aerospace Force

Navy

IRGC started naval operations using mainly swarm tactics and speedboats during "Tanker War" phase of the Iran–Iraq War.

IRGC Navy and the regular Artesh Navy overlap functions and areas of responsibility, but they are distinct in terms of how they are trained and equipped—and more importantly also in how they fight. The Revolutionary Guards Navy has a large inventory of small fast attack craft, and specializes in asymmetric hit-and-run tactics. It is more akin to a guerrilla force at sea, and maintains large arsenals of coastal defense and anti-ship cruise missiles and mines. It has also a Takavar (special force) unit, called Sepah Navy Special Force (S.N.S.F.).

Ground forces

Nuclear forces

Intelligence organization

Corps Intelligence directorate are accused of meddling in the 2021 Iranian presidential election.

Size

The 2020 edition of The Military Balance, published by IISS, says the IRGC has about 190,000 active personnel and controls the Basij on mobilisation (as much as 40,000 active paramilitary forces). It estimates the Ground Force is 150,000 strong and the Aerospace Force, which controls Iran's strategic-missile force, has some 15,000 personnel. The Naval Forces are estimated to size at least 20,000, including 5,000 Marines.

Senior commanders

 Major General Hossein Salami (Commander-in-chief)
 Commodore Ali Fadavi (Second-in-command)
 Brigadier General Mohammad Pakpour (Revolutionary Guards' Ground Forces)
 Brigadier General Amir Ali Hajizadeh (Revolutionary Guards' Aerospace Force)
 Commodore Alireza Tangsiri (Revolutionary Guards' Navy)
 Brigadier General Gholamreza Soleimani (Commander of the Mobilized Basij forces)
 Brigadier General Ismail Qaani (Quds Force)

Combat history

Iran–Iraq War

Lebanon Civil War

During the Lebanese Civil War, the IRGC allegedly sent troops to train fighters in response to the 1982 Israeli invasion of Lebanon. In Lebanon, political parties had staunch opinions regarding the IRGC's presence. Some, mainly the Christian militias such as the Lebanese Forces, Phalanges, and most of the Christian groups declared war on the IRGC, claiming they violated Lebanese sovereignty, while others, including Muslim militias, were neutral to their presence. Groups such as the PSP and Mourabiton did not approve of their presence, but to preserve political alliances they decided to remain silent on the matter.

2006 Lebanon War

During the 2006 Lebanon War, several Iranian Revolutionary Guards were reportedly killed by Israeli forces in Baalbek, a town close to the Syrian border. Israeli officials believe that Iranian Revolutionary Guards forces were responsible for training and equipping the Hezbollah fighters behind the missile attack on the INS Hanit which left four Israeli sailors dead and seriously damaged the vessel.

2006 plane crash
In January 2006, an IRGC Falcon crashed near Oroumieh, about 560 miles northwest of Tehran, near the Turkish border, Iranian media reported. All fifteen passengers died, including twelve senior IRGC commanders. Among the dead was General Ahmad Kazemi, the IRGC ground forces commander, and Iran–Iraq War veteran.

Gen. Masoud Jazayeri, spokesman for the IRGC, told state radio that both of the plane's engines had failed, its landing gear had jammed, and there was snow and poor visibility at the time.

Possible attacks on Quds Force
On 7 July 2008, investigative journalist and author Seymour Hersh wrote an article in The New Yorker stating that the Bush Administration had signed a Presidential Finding authorizing the CIA's Special Activities Division to begin cross border paramilitary operations from Iraq and Afghanistan into Iran. These operations would be against the Quds Force, the commando arm of the IRGC that had been blamed for repeated acts of violence in Iraq, and "high-value targets" in the war on terror.

October 2009 Pishin bombing

In October 2009, several top commanders of the Revolutionary Guards were killed in a suicide bombing in the Pishin region of Sistan-Baluchistan, in the south-east of Iran. The Iranian state television said 31 people died in the attack, and more than 25 were injured. Shia and Sunni tribal leaders were also killed. The Sunni Baluchi insurgent group Jundullah claimed responsibility for the attack. The Iranian government initially blamed the United States for involvement in the attacks, as well as Saudi Arabia, the United Kingdom and later Pakistan for their alleged support of the Jundallah group. The United States denied involvement, but some reports of US assistance to Jundallah during the Bush administration have come from Western sources. The attacks appear to have originated in Pakistan and several suspects have been arrested.

Syria, 2011–present

Prior to the Syrian war, Iran had between 2,000 and 3,000 IRGC officers stationed in Syria, helping to train local troops and managing supply routes of arms and money to neighboring Lebanon.

General Qa'ani, Senior officer of Army of the Guardians of the Islamic Revolution, said: "If the Islamic Republic was not present in Syria, the massacre of civilians would have been twice as bad. Had physically and non-physically stopped the rebels from killing many more among the Syrian people."

Iranian Revolutionary Guard soldiers, along with fellow Shi'ite forces from Hezbollah and members of Iran's Basij militia participated in the capture of Qusair from rebel forces on 9 June 2013. In 2014, Iran increased its deployment of IRGC in Syria.

By late 2015, 194 IRGC troops had been killed in Syria; almost all of these soldiers were officers, with several even reaching the rank of Brigadier. Additionally, 354 Afghan combatants had died who were fighting under the command of the IRGC, as part of the IRGC-equipped and trained Fatemiyoun Brigade, which is part of Hezbollah Afghanistan. Another 21 Pakistanis also died as part of the Zainabiyoun Brigade.

The Afghan and Pakistani immigrants volunteered to go to Syria in exchange for salaries and citizenship. The Afghans were recruited largely from refugees inside Iran, and usually had combat experience before joining the IRGC; their status as members of the Iranian military is only vaguely acknowledged and sometimes denied, despite the troops being uniformed fighters led by IRGC officers. They were trained and equipped in Iran, paid salaries by the Iranian military, and received state funerals involving uniformed IRGC personnel. Mid to late October 2015 was particularly bloody for the IRGC, due to them stepping up their involvement in offensives around Aleppo. During this time, 30 IRGC officers, including "three generals, battalion commanders, captains and lieutenants" and "one pilot" were killed in fighting in Syria, as were several Afghan and Pakistani auxiliaries.

The fallen included General Hossein Hamadani, Farshad Hosounizadeh (IRGC colonel and former commander of the Saberin Special Forces Brigade), Mostafa Sadrzadeh (commander of the Omar Battalion of the Fatmiyoon Brigade), and Hamid Mojtaba Mokhtarband (IRGC commander).

Iraq, 2014–present

Two battalions of Revolutionary Guards were reported to be operating in Iraq trying to combat the 2014 Northern Iraq offensive. The IRGC is considered to be a principle backer of the Popular Mobilization Forces, a loose coalition of Shi'a militias allied with the Iraqi government in its fight against the Islamic State of Iraq and Syria (ISIS). In addition, Major General Qasem Soleimani was an instrumental force in the Iranian ground mission in Iraq against ISIS, purportedly planning the Second Battle of Tikrit. In December 2014, Brigadier General Hamid Taqavi, a veteran of the 1980–1988 Iran–Iraq War, was killed by snipers in Samarra. In May 2017, Shaaban Nassiri, a senior IRGC commander was killed in combat near Mosul, Iraq. In December 2019, the U.S. Air Force conducted airstrikes on weapons caches and facilities of the IRGC-sponsored militant group Kata'ib Hezbollah. In retaliation, the group attacked the U.S. Embassy in Baghdad in the Green Zone.

On 3 January 2020, Major General Soleimani was killed in a U.S. drone strike at Baghdad International Airport along with the PMF commander Abu Mahdi al-Muhandis.

2014 Israeli drone shoot down
Iran revolutionary guards said that they had shot down an Israeli drone approaching the Natanz nuclear facility. According to ISNA, "The downed aircraft was of the stealth, radar-evasive type ... and was targeted by a ground-to-air missile before it managed to enter the area." The statement by revolutionary guards did not mention how they recognized it as an Israeli drone. Israel offered no comment.

Ukraine International Airlines Flight 752
Iranian authorities initially denied responsibility for the Ukraine International Airlines Flight 752 incident. However, the Islamic Revolutionary Guard Corps (IRGC) later admitted that the plane had been shot down by mistake.

The Aerospace Force of the Islamic Revolutionary Guard Corps took "full responsibility" for unintentionally shooting down Ukraine International Airlines Flight 752 with a surface-to-air missile on 8 January 2020. President Hassan Rouhani stated that the plane was approaching an IRGC base when it was shot down: according to a senior Revolutionary Guards commander, the plane was mistaken for a cruise missile.
On 17 January 2020, the IRGC, which shot down a Ukrainian passenger plane, were protected by Ali Khamenei in the Friday sermon. He said that the downing was a "bitter" tragedy and additionally declared that "Iran's enemies" used the crash and the military's admission to "weaken" the IRGC.

Special Operation inside Pakistan
On 3 February 2021, IRGC announced that it had conducted an intelligence-based operation inside Pakistani territory to rescue two of its border guards who were taken as hostages by Jaish ul-Adl organization two and a half years ago.

Influence

Political

As an elite group, members of Pasdaran have influence in Iran's political world. Mahmoud Ahmadinejad (President 2005–2013) joined the IRGC in 1985, serving first in military operation in Iraqi Kurdistan before leaving the front line to take charge of logistics. A majority of his first cabinet consisted of IRGC veterans. Nearly one third of the members elected to Iran's Majlis in 2004 are also "Pásdárán". Others have been appointed as ambassadors, mayors, provincial governors and senior bureaucrats. However, IRGC veteran status does not imply a single viewpoint.

Strengthening the power of the IRGC was their actions against the Green Movement, where thousands of Iranians protested election irregularities in the 2009 victory of Mahmoud Ahmadinejad over "a well-liked" reformer Mir-Hossein Mousavi. As "the demonstrations gained strength, the security forces swept in, arresting, beating, and killing protesters". The IRGC was thought to be crucial in crushing the movement which "marked a turning point" for the Islamic Republic. In a video leaked to the internet, the leader of the Pasdaran at the time, (General Mohammad Ali Jafari), opposed the protest as challenging 'the tenets of the revolution', but warned that it 'was a blow that weakened the fundamental pillars of the regime,' and demonstrated that Iran's rulers "could no longer count on popular support", 'Anyone who refuses to understand these new conditions will not be successful'.

Ayatollah Khomeini urged that the country's military forces should remain unpoliticized. However, the Constitution, in Article 150, defines the IRGC as the "guardian of the Revolution and of its achievements" which is at least partly a political mission. His original views have therefore been the subject of debate. Supporters of the Basiji have argued for politicization, while reformists, moderates and Hassan Khomeini opposed it. President Rafsanjani forced military professionalization and ideological deradicalization on the IRGC to curb its political role, but the Pasdaran became natural allies of Supreme Leader Ali Khamenei when reformists threatened him. The IRGC grew stronger under President Ahmedinejad, and assumed formal command of the Basiji militia in early 2009.

Although never explicitly endorsing or affiliating themselves with any political parties, the Alliance of Builders of Islamic Iran (or Abadgaran), is widely viewed as a political front for the Revolutionary Guards. Many former members (including Ahmadinejad) have joined this party in recent years and the Revolutionary Guards have reportedly given them financial support.

Economic activity

IRGC first expanded into commercial activity through informal social networking of veterans and former officials. IRGC officials confiscated assets of many refugees who had fled Iran after the fall of Abolhassan Banisadr's government. It is now a vast conglomerate, controlling Iran's missile batteries and nuclear program but also a multibillion-dollar business empire reaching almost all economic sectors. Estimates of the fraction of Iran's economy that it controls through a series of subsidiaries and trusts vary from ten percent to over 50.

The Los Angeles Times estimates that IRGC has ties to over one hundred companies, with its annual revenue exceeding $12 billion in business and construction. IRGC has been awarded billions of dollars in contracts in the oil, gas and petrochemical industries, as well as major infrastructure projects.

The following commercial entities have been named by the United States as owned or controlled by the IRGC and its leaders.
 Khatam al-Anbia Construction Headquarters, the IRGC's major engineering arm & one of Iran's largest contractors employing about 25,000 engineers and staff on military (70%) and non-military (30%) projects worth over $7 billion in 2006.
 Oriental Oil Kish (oil and gas industry)
 Ghorb Nooh
 Sahel Consultant Engineering
 Ghorb Karbala
 Sepasad Engineering Co. (excavation and tunnel construction)
 Omran Sahel
 Hara Company (excavation and tunnel construction)
 Gharargahe Sazandegi Ghaem
 Imensazen Consultant Engineers Institute (subsidiary of Khatam al-Anbia)
 Fater Engineering Institute (subsidiary of Khatam al-Anbia)

In September 2009, the Government of Iran sold 51% of the shares of the Telecommunication Company of Iran to the Mobin Trust Consortium (Etemad-e-Mobin), a group affiliated with the Guards, for the sum of $7.8 billion. This was the largest transaction on the Tehran Stock Exchange in history. IRGC also owns 45% participation in automotive Bahman Group and has a majority stake in Iran's naval giant SADRA through Khatam al-Anbia.

The IRGC also exerts influence over bonyads, wealthy, non-governmental ostensibly charitable foundations controlled by key clerics. The pattern of revolutionary foundations mimics the style of informal and extralegal economic networks from the time of the Shah. Their development started in the early 1990s, gathered pace over the next decade, and accelerated even more with many lucrative no-bid contracts from the Ahmadinejad presidency. The IRGC exerts informal, but real, influence over many such organizations including:
 Mostazafan Foundation (Foundation of the Oppressed or The Mostazafan Foundation)
 Bonyad Shahid va Omur-e Janbazan (Foundation of Martyrs and Veterans Affairs)

As an elite force with great economic assets it has developed into what some observers call an "untouchable élite" and somewhat isolated in Iranian society. According to a "former senior Middle Eastern intelligence officer", the Guard and their families "have their own schools, their own markets, their own neighborhoods, their own resorts. The neighborhoods look like a carbon copy of Beverly Hills."

Former Bank Ansar and Bank Mehr Iranian were run by corps IRGC Cooperation Bonyad until merger with state Bank Sepah.

Analysis
Mehdi Khalaji of the Washington Institute for Near East Policy argues that the IRGC is "the spine of the current political structure and a major player in the Iranian economy." The once theocratic state has evolved into a garrison state, like Burma, whereby the military dominates social, cultural, political, and economic life, protecting the government from internal rather than external opponents.

Greg Bruno and Jayshree Bajoria of the Council on Foreign Relations agree, stating that the IRGC has expanded well beyond its mandate and into a "socio-military-political-economic force" that deeply penetrates Iran's power structure. "The Guards' involvement in politics has grown to unprecedented levels since 2004, when IRGC won at least 16 percent of the 290 seats" in the Islamic Consultative Assembly of Iran. During the elections of March 2008, IRGC veterans won 182 out of 290 seats, helping Mahmoud Ahmadinejad consolidate power.

Half of Ahmadinejad's cabinet was composed of former IRGC officers while several others were appointed to provincial governorships.

Ali Alfoneh of the American Enterprise Institute contends that "While the presence of former IRGC officers in the cabinet is not a new phenomenon, their numbers under Ahmadinejad—they occupy nine of the twenty-one ministry portfolios—are unprecedented." Additionally, Ahmadinejad successfully purged provincial governorships of Rafsanjani and Khatami supporters and replaced them not only with IRGC members, but also members of the Basij and the Islamic Republic prison administration.

The IRGC chief, General Mohammad Ali Jafari, announced that the Guards' would go through internal restructuring in order to counter "internal threats to the Islamic Republic." Bruce Riedel, a Senior Fellow at the Brookings Institution and former CIA analyst, argues the Guards was created to protect the government against a possible coup.

Since the disputed 2009 presidential elections, debate over how powerful the IRGC is has reemerged. Danielle Pletka and Ali Alfoneh see the irreversible militarization of Iran's government. Abbas Milani, director of Iranian Studies at Stanford University, believes the Guards’ power actually exceeds that of Supreme Leader Ayatollah Khamenei. Frederic Wehrey, adjunct Senior Fellow at the RAND Corporation believes the Revolutionary Guards is not a cohesive unit of similar-minded conservatives but rather a factionalized institution that is hardly bent on overthrowing their masters.

U.S. Department of the Treasury terrorist aid claims 
The U.S. Department of the Treasury claims the Corp has supported several organizations the U.S. deems to be terrorist, including Hizballah, Hamas, Palestinian Islamic Jihad (PIJ), The Popular Front for the Liberation of Palestine-General Command (PFLP-GC), and the Taliban. In the U.S. Department of the Treasury's report, four IRGC senior officials, Hushang Alladad, Hossein Musavi, Hasan Mortezavi, and Mohammad Reza Zahedi, were specifically named for providing support to terrorist organizations. Hushang Alladad, a financial officer for the IRGC, was cited as personally administering financial support to terrorist groups including Hizballah, Hamas, and PIJ. Both General Hossein Musavi and Colonel Hasan Mortevazi were claimed to have provided financial and material support to the Taliban. Mohammad Reza Zahedi, the IRGC commander in Lebanon, was claimed to have played a crucial role in Iran's aid to Hizballah. According to the U.S. Department of the Treasury, Zahedi served as a liaison to Hizballah and Syrian intelligence services as well as taking part in weapon deals involving Hizballah. The U.S. Treasury report goes on to detail the IRGC's methods of support for terrorist groups: "The Government of Iran also uses the Islamic Revolutionary Guard Corps (IRGC) and IRGC-QF to implement its foreign policy goals, including, but not limited to, seemingly legitimate activities that provide cover for intelligence operations and support to terrorist and insurgent groups. These activities include economic investment, reconstruction, and other types of aid to Iraq, Afghanistan, and Lebanon, implemented by companies and institutions that act for or on behalf of, or are owned or controlled by the IRGC and the Iranian government."

Corporations in media
 Owj Arts and Media Organization, Tasnim news agency

Controversy

From its origin as an ideologically driven militia, the IRGC has taken an ever more assertive role in virtually every aspect of Iranian society. Its part in suppressing dissent has led many analysts to describe the events surrounding the 12 June 2009 presidential election as a military coup, and the IRGC as an authoritarian military security government for which its Shiite clerical system is no more than a facade.

Since its establishment, IRGC has been involved in many economic and military activities among which some raised controversies. The organization has been accused of smuggling (including importing illegal alcoholic beverages, cigarettes and satellite dishes, into Iran via jetties not supervised by the Government), training and supplying Hezbollah and Hamas fighters, and of being involved in the Iraq War.

In December 2009, evidence uncovered during an investigation by the Guardian newspaper and Guardian Films linked the IRGC to the kidnappings of 5 Britons from a government ministry building in Baghdad in 2007. Three of the hostages, Jason Creswell, Jason Swindlehurst and Alec Maclachlan, were killed. Alan Mcmenemy's body was never found but Peter Moore was released on 30 December 2009. The investigation uncovered evidence that Moore, 37, a computer expert from Lincoln was targeted because he was installing a system for the Iraqi Government that would show how a vast amount of international aid was diverted to Iran's militia groups in Iraq.

According to Geneive Abdo, IRGC members were appointed "as ambassadors, mayors, cabinet ministers, and high-ranking officials at state-run economic institutions" during the administration of president Ahmadinejad. Appointments in 2009 by Supreme Leader Ali Khamenei have given "hard-liners" in the guard "unprecedented power" and included "some of the most feared and brutal men in Iran."

In May 2019, the United States accused the IRGC of being "directly responsible" for an attack on commercial ships in the Gulf of Oman. Michael M. Gilday, United States director of the Joint Staff, described US intelligence attributing that the IRGC used limpet mines to attack four oil tankers anchored in the Gulf of Oman for bunkering through the Port of Fujairah.

In April 2020, during the COVID-19 pandemic, the IRGC unveiled the Mostaan 110, an experimental medical device that the IRGC claimed could detect instances of COVID-19 using electromagnetic radiation. The IRGC's claims of Mostaan 110's capabilities were met with widespread criticism from both Iranian and international experts, who called it pseudoscientific and compared it to the ADE 651, a fake explosive detector with a similar design.

In December 2022, German authorities accused the IRGC of attempting to orchestrate attacks against synagogues in the state of North Rhine-Westphalia and spying on the president of the Central Council of Jews in Germany.

Terrorist designation and sanctions

Since 15 April 2019, the United States, which opposes the activities of Sepah, considers the IRGC as a terrorist organization, which some top CIA and Pentagon officials reportedly opposed. On 8 April, Israeli Prime Minister Benjamin Netanyahu tweeted in Hebrew that America's terrorist designation was the fulfillment of "another important request of mine." This designation was criticized by a number of governments including Turkey, Iraq and China as well as the Islamic Consultative Assembly, Iran's parliament, in which members wore IRGC uniforms in protest.

On 29 April 2019, United States Deputy Assistant Secretary of Defense Michael Mulroy said Iran posed five threats. The first was Iran obtaining a nuclear weapon. The second was to maritime security in the Straits of Hormuz and the Bab al-Mandab, because a substantial portion of energy trade and commercial goods go through those areas. The third was because of their support to proxies and terrorist organizations, including Hezbollah in Lebanon and Syria, Houthis in Yemen, some Hashd al-Shaabi in Iraq and safe-harboring senior al-Qaeda leaders in Iran. The fourth was Iranian made ballistic missiles sent to Houthi-controlled areas of Yemen for use against Saudi Arabia and to Syria with Hezbollah to use against Israel. Cyber is the fifth threat and a growing concern. He also said that the terrorist designation did not grant any additional authorities to the Department of Defense and that they were not asking for any.

The IRGC has never been designated as a terrorist organization by the United Nations, although the UNSCR 1929 had its assets frozen (this was lifted in 2016). Since 2010, the European Union has imposed broad sanctions on the IRGC and many of its members, without designating it as a terrorist organization.

Although Saudi Arabia and Bahrain already designated the IRGC as a terrorist organisation, several countries such as Australia are examining the possibility to designate the group as well (Canada already outlawed Quds Force in 2012). On 3 October 2022, in reaction to the death of Mahsa Amini and the persecution of protestors in the protests that ensued, Canada officially sanctioned the IRGC. Foreign Affairs Minister Melanie Joly announced sanctions targeting 9 entities, including the Morality Police and the Iranian Ministry of Intelligence and Security, and 25 individuals, that include high-ranking officials and members of the Islamic Revolutionary Guard Corps. These individuals include IRGC Commander-in-Chief Major General Hossein Salami, and Esmail Qaani, commander of the Quds Force of the IRGC. On 7 October, the Canadian government expanded the sanctions, banning 10,000 members of the Islamic Revolutionary Guard Corps from entering the country permanently, which represents the top 50% of the organization's leadership. Canadian Prime Minister Justin Trudeau added that Canada plans to expand the sanctions against those most responsible for Iran's "egregious behavior". Canadian Deputy Prime Minister Chrystia Freeland added that Iran was a "state sponsor of terror", and that "it is oppressive, theocratic and misogynist; The IRGC leadership are terrorists, the IRGC is a terrorist organization".

According to Arab News, a 2020 report by the "Tony Blair Institute for Global Change" said that the Islamic Revolutionary Guard Corps is an "institutionalized militia" that "uses its vast resources to spread a 'mission of jihad' through an 'ideological army' of recruits and proxies". In 2022, U.S. Secretary of State Antony Blinken said that the IRGC is "probably the most designated organisation – one way or another – in the world among the organisations that we designate, including the foreign terrorist organisation designation".

In January 2023, the United Kingdom was preparing to declare the IRGC a terrorist organization.

On 18 January 2023, the European Parliament passed an amendment proposed by the ECR Group, to call for the EU and its member states to include the IRGC on EU's terrorist list.

Response to terrorist organization designation
The move was met with unfavorable reactions from Iranian leaders and militants. Shortly after the US announced the designation, the Iranian government declared the United States Central Command, whose area of responsibility includes the Middle East, as a terrorist organization. According to Iran's Supreme National Security Council, the move "was in response to the illegal and unwise move from the U.S." On the following day, Iranian Members of Parliament displayed their support of the IRGC by collectively wearing green military pants and chanted "death to America" as they opened session. Iranian president Hassan Rouhani also responded to the move, commenting that it was a mistake which would only increase the IRGC's popularity in Iran and elsewhere.

Since the designation, the United States Department of State's Rewards for Justice Program has offered a reward of up to US$15 million for financial background information about the Islamic Revolutionary Guard Corps and its branches, including an IRGC financier, Abdul Reza Shahlai, who it says was responsible for a raid that killed five American soldiers in Karbala, Iraq on 20 January 2007.

See also

 Composite Index of National Capability
 Islamic Republic of Iran Army
 Ministry of Revolutionary Guards
 Rahian-e Noor
 Research and Self-Sufficiency Jihad Organization

References and notes

Notes

References

Further reading
 
 Hesam Forozan, The Military in Post-Revolutionary Iran: The Evolution and Roles of the Revolutionary Guards, c. 2017
 Safshekan, Roozbeh; Sabet, Farzan, "The Ayatollah's Praetorians: The Islamic Revolutionary Guard Corps and the 2009 Election Crisis", The Middle East Journal, Volume 64, Number 4, Autumn 2010, pp. 543–558(16).
 (discusses U.S. military clashes with Iranian Revolutionary Guard during the Iran–Iraq War)

External links

 Official media news outlet used by the Army of the Guardians of the Islamic Revolution (in Persian)
 Vali Nasr and Ali Gheissari (13 December 2004) "Foxes in Iran's Henhouse", New York Times op-ed article about the growing IRGC role in Iran's power structure
 David Ignatius (17 April 2008) "A Blast Still Reverberating" Washington Post Discussion of 1983 Beirut US Embassy bombing

Islamic Revolutionary Guard Corps
Military units and formations established in 1979
1979 establishments in Iran
Organizations designated as terrorist by Bahrain
Organizations designated as terrorist by Saudi Arabia
Organizations designated as terrorist by the United States
Iranian security organisations
Military of Iran
Anti-ISIL factions in Iraq
Anti-ISIL factions in Syria
Pro-government factions of the Syrian civil war
Paramilitary organisations based in Iran
Pan-Islamism
Anti-Zionist organizations
Anti-Zionism in Asia
Iran–Saudi Arabia relations
Iran–United States relations